Nicolas Sahnoun (born 3 September 1980) is a French retired footballer who played as a midfielder.

Football career
Born in Bordeaux of Algerian descent, Sahnoun emerged through local FC Girondins de Bordeaux's youth ranks, but appeared sparingly for its first team during his spell as a senior, also being loaned twice: he helped English club Fulham achieve promotion to the Premier League for the first time ever, repeating the feat back in his country with Ligue 2's AC Ajaccio.

In January 2004, aged 23, Sahnoun moved to Spain, after signing with Segunda División side UD Almería, where he would play for one-and-a-half seasons. Subsequently, he returned to France, spending three years – one-and-a-half apiece – with Stade Brestois 29 and Dijon FCO in the second level.

Sahnoun achieved his third second tier promotion in the 2008–09 campaign, with Montpellier HSC, but appeared rarely for the Rolland Courbis-led team (also his manager at Bordeaux) and left for Racing de Ferrol in the Spanish Segunda División B for one season, on loan.

Personal life
Sahnoun's father, Omar, was also a footballer and a midfielder. He too played for Bordeaux.

References

External links

1980 births
Living people
Footballers from Bordeaux
French sportspeople of Algerian descent
French footballers
Association football midfielders
Ligue 1 players
Ligue 2 players
FC Girondins de Bordeaux players
AC Ajaccio players
Stade Brestois 29 players
Dijon FCO players
Montpellier HSC players
English Football League players
Fulham F.C. players
Segunda División players
Segunda División B players
UD Almería players
Racing de Ferrol footballers
French expatriate footballers
Expatriate footballers in England
Expatriate footballers in Spain
French expatriate sportspeople in Spain
Mediterranean Games bronze medalists for France
Mediterranean Games medalists in football
Competitors at the 2001 Mediterranean Games